Dandolo is an Italian surname. The Dandolo family of the Republic of Venice produced several Doges. Notable people with the surname include:

Four Doges of Venice:
Enrico Dandolo, 41st Doge
Giovanni Dandolo, 48th Doge
Francesco Dandolo, 52nd Doge
Andrea Dandolo, 54th Doge
Two Risorgimento fighters
Enrico Dandolo (patriot)
Emilio Dandolo
Andrea Dandolo (admiral), Venetian admiral, not the same man as the Doge of this name
Vincenzo, Count Dandolo, chemist, agriculturist and Napoleon's governor of Dalmatia

See also
, named after the Doge Enrico Dandolo
Dandolo, Maniago - frazione of the comune of Maniago, province of Pordenone.

Italian-language surnames